CafePress, Inc. is an American online retailer of stock and user-customized on-demand products. The company was founded in San Mateo, California, but is now headquartered in Louisville, Kentucky along with its production facility. In 2001, CafePress.com won the People's Voice Webby Award in the Commerce category.

Business model 

CafePress.com sells T-shirts, bags, mugs, wall clocks, calendars, and a myriad of other products. Customers can upload their own graphics design, logo or text, which will be added to the product by the company. CafePress.com also offers print on demand services for wall art and stationery. The site also allows the user to have a virtual CafePress "shop" including an online storefront and website hosting, order management, fulfillment, payment processing, and customer service.

History 

CafePress, Inc. was founded as a privately-owned company in 1999 by Fred Durham and Maheesh Jain. As of February 2006, the site hosts over 2.6 million online shops with over 200 million products. As of March 2011, CafePress.com has more than 13 million members and over 325 million products are available on the site.

In July 2008, CafePress acquired the specialist photographic art printing business Imagekind, and in September 2010 acquired photo-to-canvas company Canvas On Demand to their platform of brands.

In June 2011, CafePress filed with the SEC to raise up to $80 million in an initial public offering.

On March 29, 2012, CafePress debuted at $19/share on the NASDAQ under ticker symbol PRSS. The stock hit an intraday high of $22.69/share.

On April 30, 2012, CafePress announced that it would move its corporate headquarters from San Mateo, California to its production facilities in Louisville, Kentucky, at a cost of $16.5 million. Louisville and the state of Kentucky had offered incentives as high as $10 million for the move, up to $1 million per year for ten years.

On September 28, 2018, Snapfish agreed to acquire CafePress for approximately $25 million, purchasing all outstanding CafePress stock for $1.48 per share in cash. The buyout was completed in November.

In February 2019, CafePress suffered a data breach. The exposed data included 23 million unique email addresses with some records also containing names, physical addresses, phone numbers, and security question/answer pairs. Over 180,000 records contained social security numbers. A 2022 FTC complaint alleges that CafePress was negligent in its security practices and failed to notify customers promptly after it became aware of this breach, waiting until after security researchers disclosed it publicly.

On September 1, 2020, it was announced that PlanetArt had acquired CafePress from Snapfish/Shutterfly.

Brands 

CafePress, Inc. has its flagship brand, CafePress.com. CafePress, Inc. also partners with other businesses to provide licensed content on their site, and power online custom shops for large companies, such as ABC, Urban Outfitters, and Peanuts Worldwide.

References

External links 

 

1999 establishments in California
American companies established in 1999
Companies based in Louisville, Kentucky
Companies formerly listed on the Nasdaq
Internet properties established in 1999
Online retailers of the United States
Retail companies established in 1999
Self-publishing companies
Self-publishing online stores
2012 initial public offerings
2018 mergers and acquisitions